Lezama is a town and municipality located in the province of Biscay, in the autonomous community of Basque Country, northern Spain. It is home to the training headquarters of the football team Athletic Bilbao, and is accessible by bus - BizkaiBus (A3223) - from Bilbao.

References

External links
LEZAMA in the Bernardo Estornés Lasa - Auñamendi Encyclopedia (Euskomedia Fundazioa) 

Municipalities in Biscay